Giacomo Satalino (born 20 May 1999) is an Italian professional footballer who plays as a goalkeeper for  club Carrarese, on loan from Sassuolo.

Club career

Fiorentina
Satalino started playing for Serie A side Fiorentina's under-19 squad in the 2015–16 season. In that season and the next, he appeared on the bench as a backup for the senior squad 26 times in different competitions, but did not see any time on the field.

Sassuolo
In July 2017, Satalino transferred to fellow-Serie A club Sassuolo, and spent the 2017–18 season in their under-19 squad. In the 2018–19 season, he appeared on the bench for the senior squad 17 times, but again did not see any field time.

Loan to Renate
On 31 July 2019, Satalino joined Serie C club Renate on a season-long loan. He made his professional league debut on 25 August 2019, in a season-opening game against Giana Erminio. He established himself as first-choice goalkeeper for Renate early in the season.

Loan to Cesena 
On 1 September 2020, Satalino went to Cesena on loan, also in the Serie C. He began the season as a starter, but was injured in his sixth game; upon recovery from the injury he could not reclaim the first-goalkeeper spot that had been taken over by Michele Nardi.

Loan to Monopoli 
On 15 January 2021 he was loaned to Monopoli.

Return to Sassuolo and Serie A debut
Satalino made his Serie A debut for Sassuolo on 22 May 2022 against Milan, on the last day of the 2021–22 season with 8 minutes left in the game that Sassuolo lost 0–3.

Loan to Carrarese
On 2 August 2022, Satalino was loaned by Carrarese.

International career
Satalino made his first appearances representing his country internationally in 2014, in friendly games for the under-16 team. He also played at under-17 and under-18 levels.

References

1999 births
Sportspeople from the Metropolitan City of Bari
Footballers from Apulia
Living people
Italian footballers
Association football goalkeepers
ACF Fiorentina players
U.S. Sassuolo Calcio players
A.C. Renate players
Cesena F.C. players
S.S. Monopoli 1966 players
Carrarese Calcio players
Serie C players
Serie A players
Italy youth international footballers